Roman Olehovych Vovk (born 5 March 1997) is a Ukrainian professional footballer who plays as a forward for Chernihiv.

Career
He started his career in the youth systems of Yunist Chernihiv, LKT Chernihiv, Ingulets, Avangard Korukivka, and Frunzynets. In 2018 he moved to Desna Chernihiv and was loaned to Desna-2 Chernihiv, the reserve team's reserve side, for the season. In 2020 he moved to FK Kudrivka before moving to Fakel Lipovets in 2021.

FC Chernihiv
On 25 August 2022 he signed for FC Chernihiv. On 27 August he made his debut in the Ukrainian First League against Skoruk Tomakivka at the Yunist Stadium. On 8 October, he scored against Poltava in Lokomotyv Stadium in Poltava. The following week, he scored twice against Skoruk Tomakivka and earned Man of the Match honours.

Career statistics

Club

References

External links
Profile from Ukrainian First League

1997 births
Living people
Footballers from Chernihiv
Association football midfielders
FC Yunist Chernihiv players
FC Desna Chernihiv players
FC Desna-2 Chernihiv players
FC Inhulets-2 Petrove players
FC Avanhard Koriukivka players
FC Chernihiv players
FC Kudrivka players
Ukrainian footballers
Ukrainian First League players
Ukrainian Amateur Football Championship players
Association football forwards